Meadow Farm is an unincorporated community in Muskingum County, in the U.S. state of Ohio.

History
A post office called Meadow Farm was established in 1840 and remained in operation until 1863. Besides the post office, Meadow Farm had a Protestant church.

References

Unincorporated communities in Muskingum County, Ohio
1840 establishments in Ohio
Populated places established in 1840
Unincorporated communities in Ohio